Eoin Dubh mac Alasdair (Anglicised: John the Black, son of Alexander) was a son of Ranald mac Alasdair, and was a chief of Clan MacAlister.

Eoin Dubh created his seat at Ardpatrick, South Knapdale. He was succeeded upon his death by his son Charles, who had been appointed Steward of Kintyre in 1483.

Citations

References

Eoin
Medieval Gaels from Scotland
People from Knapdale
15th-century Scottish people